Kyvos is a business intelligence acceleration platform for cloud and big data platforms developed by an American privately held company named Kyvos Insights. The company, headquartered in Los Gatos, California, was founded by Praveen Kankariya, CEO of Impetus Technologies. The software provides OLAP-based multidimensional analysis on big data and cloud platforms and was launched officially in June 2015.  In December the same year, the company was listed among the 10 Coolest Big Data Startups of 2015 by CRN Magazine.

Technology 
The software uses OLAP technology to enable business intelligence on the cloud and big data platforms. In a report published by Forrester Research in 2016, where they evaluated several native Hadoop business intelligence (BI) platforms on 22 parameters, Kyvos was referred to as a platform that gave new life to OLAP by bringing it to Hadoop. As per the report, Kyvos enables analysis on Hadoop based on OLAP schemas, aggregations, and predefined drill-down paths. It pre-calculates aggregates at multiple levels of dimensional hierarchies to improve query response times as compared to SQL-on-Hadoop platforms. Users can analyze data through the Kyvos visualization tool or by using other BI platforms.

Kyvos was originally built for Hadoop and later on added support for Cloud platforms such as Amazon Web Services (AWS), Google Cloud and Microsoft Azure. Initially, it supported only MDX queries and integrated with data visualization tools such as Excel and Tableau.  In 2017, Kyvos 4.0 added support for SQL connectivity extending integration to other BI tools such as Business Objects, Cognos,  MicroStrategy, Power BI and Qlik.

In late 2018, Version 5 of the software was built specifically for the cloud with elastic OLAP to provide a cloud native way to scale up and down for changing data workloads.

With its 2020.2 release, Kyvos added support for Snowflake data warehouse. The product was also made available on Microsoft Azure marketplace and Amazon Web Services marketplace.

In January 2021, MicroStrategy launched a new gateway connector for Kyvos with its latest version MicroStrategy 2021.

In April 2021, Kyvos announced the general availability of Kyvos Free, a full-featured free version of their platform on the cloud.

Major releases 

 First release in June 2015.
 Kyvos 2.0 released in June 2016 with support for Amazon Web Services and additional BI tools.
 Kyvos 4.0 released in August 2017 with support for SQL queries, enhanced performance, and support for concurrent users.
Kyvos 5 released in November 2018 with elastic OLAP for native cloud support and data profiling features.
Kyvos 2020.2 released in May 2020 with support for Snowflake cloud data warehouse  and general availability on Azure and AWS marketplace.
Kyvos 2020.3 released in June 2020 with a built-in Smart Recommendation Engine for building Smart Aggregates, scheduled elasticity for Kyvos query engines, and BigQuery support on GCP.
Kyvos 2020.4 released in October 2020 with support for Azure AD, custom row-level security, and calculated measures in MS Excel.
Kyvos 2020.5 released in January 2021 with support for AWS Redshift, framework for scaling build clusters to minimum nodes, and multiple REST APIs.
Kyvos 2021.1 released in May 2021 with support for Snowflake warehouse on Azure, Quick Data Modeling allowing wizard-based cube designing, and multi-Tenancy.
Kyvos 2021.2 released in August 2021 allows Cohort analysis with Kyvos Visualization and offers support for Azure SQL database connection, Databricks cluster in AWS, and strong cluster validation frameworks.
Kyvos 2021.3 released in January 2022 with Alteryx support via Spark ODBC connection, Livy support on AWS, and XLCubed Desktop via MDX connectivity. The platform announced SOC 2 compliance for its Managed Service Offering.
Kyvos 2022.1 released in April 2022 with support for XLCubed, Teradata connectivity, and GCP Secret Manager.
Kyvos 2022.2 released in July 2022 with support for AWS Athena, SendGrid email server, and incremental build enhancements.
Kyvos 2022.3 released in November 2022 with support for load-based scaling, Oracle RDS connectivity, and raw data querying for Google BigQuery connections.

Awards 
 In June 2018, Kyvos technology won the TDWI's Best Practices Award in the Emerging Technologies and Methods category for a customer implementation.
The company ranked amongst CRN’s Coolest Business Analytics Companies of 2021 in the big data category.

See also 
Impetus Technologies
Comparison of OLAP servers

References

External links 
 

Big data companies
Big data products
Companies based in Santa Clara County, California
Privately held companies based in California
Online analytical processing
Business intelligence companies
Hadoop
Companies based in Silicon Valley
Los Gatos, California
2015 establishments in California
Business services companies established in 2015
American companies established in 2015